Persististrombus radix  is an extinct species of fossil sea snail, a marine gastropod mollusk in the family Strombidae, the conchs.

Fossil record
Fossils of Persististrombus radix are found in marine strata of the Oligocene (age range: from 28.4 to 23.03 million years ago.).  Fossils are known from Bulgaria, France, Greece, India, Iran and Somalia.

References

 Mathias Harzhauser and Gijs C. Kronenberg The Neogene Strombid Gastropod Persististrombus in the Paratethys Sea

Strombidae